Zune is an object-oriented GUI toolkit which is part of the AROS (AROS Research Operating System) project and nearly a clone, at both an API and look-and-feel level, of Magic User Interface (MUI), a well-known Amiga shareware product by Stefan Stuntz.

Zune is based on the BOOPSI system, the framework inherited from AmigaOS for object-oriented programming in C. Zune classes don't derive from existing BOOPSI gadget classes; instead, the Notify class (base class of the Zune hierarchy) derives from the BOOPSI root class.

Wanderer
Wanderer is the whole desktop and not only window manager user interface that is based on Zune widget toolkit. It sports an interface that recalls Amiga GUI Workbench window manager which presents a desktop environment paradigm, and its graphical aspect is enhanced with Magical User Interface features and styleguides. It supports themes and various types of icons such as Amiga Icons planar style (AmigaOS 3.1), Iconcolor (AmigaOS 3.5) and .png icons. The actual set of icons in Wanderer has been realized by Adam Chodorowski, and is based upon Linux icon subset called Gorilla icons present in GNOME repository.

As a work in progress Wanderer is still far from being completed. The main task of the developers of AROS is to make its desktop interface capable to recall the aspect and the ease of use of its predecessor (the Amiga Workbench), and enhancing the Wanderer desktop with any modern technology and feature as any modern user interface nowadays.

References

External links

 Article about AROS on OSNews.com
 Zune Application Development Manual

Amiga APIs
AROS software
Widget toolkits